Barbara Zdunk (1769 – 21 August 1811) was an ethnically Polish alleged arsonist accused of witchcraft. Zdunk lived in the town of Rößel, in what was then East Prussia, and is now Reszel in Poland. She is considered by many to have been the last woman executed for witchcraft in Europe. Although, the accusations of witchcraft were listed in her case, witchcraft was not a criminal offense in Prussia at the time.

The case
In 1806, a devastating fire ravaged the town of Rößel, which burnt almost entirely to the ground. Zdunk, who was a maid known for her fondness of magic, was blamed. She was arrested in 1807, and imprisoned in Rößel castle. No evidence of substance was available, but she was still accused and found guilty of causing the fire. In 1811, Zdunk was executed by burning at the stake on a hill outside Rößel, though she was apparently strangled to death by the executioner before the fire was set. 

It is believed today that a group of Polish soldiers were the actual arsonists. There is uncertainty as to the true reason for Zdunk's conviction, which was upheld by several appeal courts, up to the king himself. Revenge on Poland on the part of the Prussian authorities or a concession to an outraged public may have played a role, or that she was a 38-year-old woman who had a teenage boyfriend.

Similar to the execution of Anna Göldi in 1782, who is frequently claimed to be the last person to be executed for witchcraft in Europe, it is dubious whether the trial of Zdunk can be counted as a witch trial in a legal sense.

See also 
 Doruchów witch trial, likely the last larger witch trial in Poland
 Mary Bateman, a contemporary case of a similar execution
 Krystyna Ceynowa, a somewhat later case of an illegal witch trial in Poland

References

Source
 Neil Wilson, Tom Parkinson, Richard Watkins: Poland (Lonely Planet Publications)

People executed for witchcraft
Executed Polish people
People executed by Prussia
Executed Polish women
1769 births
1811 deaths
People executed by Germany by burning
People from Kętrzyn County
Witchcraft in Poland
Witchcraft in Germany